Not be confused with the Dean Burgon Society, concerned with the advocacy of the King James Bible

The Burgon Society is a learned society and educational charity for the study and research of academic dress. The society was founded in 2000 and is named after John William Burgon (1813–1888) from whom the Burgon shape academic hood takes its name. Its current president is Graham Zellick, CBE, QC, former Vice-Chancellor of the University of London. His predecessors were James P. S. Thomson, former Master of London Charterhouse (2011–16) and the organist John Birch.

In 2010, the society received charity status from the Charity Commission.

Activities
The society publishes Transactions of the Burgon Society, an annual journal of peer-reviewed research into academic dress. It holds a spring conference each year and organises visits to robemakers, universities and other institutions. 

One of the society's founding fellows, Nicholas Groves, created the Groves classification system for academic dress, in which the most common shapes of British gowns, hoods and caps are coded for easy reference. He also designed the gowns of the University of Malta. His design, selected from entries submitted in an international competition, debuted in November 2011 at a degree ceremony in Valletta, Malta.

Membership
Membership is open to all who support the aims of the society. Fellowship (FBS) is awarded to members on the successful submission of a piece of original work on a topic approved by the executive committee. Fellowship may also be awarded to any member who has demonstrated in some other way a significant contribution to the study of academic dress. Occasionally, the fellowship may be awarded honoris causa.

Patrons
The patrons of the society are:
The Rt Revd and Rt Hon. The Lord Chartres, GCVO, former Bishop of London
The Rt Revd Graeme Knowles, CVO, former Dean of St Paul's

Footnotes

References

 

 Article describing the Society's tenth anniversary activities.

External links
Official website
Transactions of the Burgon Society

Clubs and societies in the United Kingdom
Academic dress
Learned societies of the United Kingdom
History organisations based in the United Kingdom
2000 establishments in the United Kingdom